Monique Conti (born 9 December 1999) is an Australian rules footballer and former basketballer. Conti currently plays for the Richmond Football Club in the AFL Women's (AFLW), having previously played for the Western Bulldogs from 2018 to 2019. She also played in the Women's National Basketball League (WNBL) for the Melbourne Boomers from 2016 to 2020 and the Southside Flyers in 2020.

As an Australian rules footballer, Conti received a nomination for the 2018 AFL Women's Rising Star award in round 4 of the 2018 season and went on to win an AFL Women's premiership with the Bulldogs that season, and was adjudged best afield in the grand final. She was also selected in the 2019 AFL Women's All-Australian team and won the Western Bulldogs best and fairest award in 2019 before moving to Richmond, where she won the inaugural four Richmond best and fairest awards in her first four seasons at the club and was selected in the AFL Women's All-Australian team in 2021, 2022 and season seven. Conti was also named the AFLPA AFLW most valuable player in season seven.

As a basketballer, Conti was a member of the Australian team that won the gold medal at the 2016 FIBA Under-17 World Championship for Women and was named in that year's All-Tournament Team. She also won the WNBL Rookie of the Year Award in her first WNBL season with the Boomers in 2017, before moving to the Flyers ahead of 2020, winning a WNBL championship in her only season at the club.

Early life
Conti was born in Fitzroy, Victoria. She studied at Maribyrnong College in her secondary school years, and looked up to other Australian dual-sport athletes such as Ellyse Perry and fellow footballer/basketballer and AFL Women's player Erin Phillips.

Conti started playing football from the age of ten, playing with boys at the Essendon Doutta Stars Football Club until the age of 14 and then in the Melbourne University under-18 youth girls team until the age of 17, making the Vic Metro and All-Australian teams in all three years playing at that level. In September 2016, Conti was one of 15 players from around Australia selected in level 2 of the inaugural AFL Women's academy. Conti played for the Calder Cannons in the TAC Cup Girls in 2017 alongside current AFL Women's players such as AFL Women's Rising Star winners Chloe Molloy and Madison Prespakis, and was coached by current player Alicia Eva. Earlier in the year, at a testing day prior to the five-round season, she ranked first among TAC Cup Girls players in both the 20-metre sprint and agility test. Conti also played for Melbourne University in the VFL Women's (VFLW) in 2017 before being drafted.

Conti started playing basketball from the age of five, playing with the Melbourne Tigers for the entirety of her junior basketball years and in the South East Australian Basketball League (SEABL) in 2017 and 2018. Prior to the creation of the AFL Women's, Conti had aspirations to play college basketball in the United States from a young age, and received offers from over thirty schools to play there at the age of 16, but instead committed to studying at Deakin University, which was aligned with the Melbourne Boomers, allowing her to continue her studies and to continue playing basketball at national level, along with football. She began studying a business degree there in 2018 while also part of its Elite Athlete program.

Basketball career

National team
Conti made her junior international debut at the 2016 U17 World Championship in Spain with the U17 Sapphires. Conti lead the Sapphires to their inaugural title in Spain. After snapping team USA's 28-game win streak at U17 level, Australia went on to take home Gold. Alongside two of her teammates, Conti was named to the All-Tournament Team.

WNBL

Melbourne Boomers
Conti began her professional career with the Melbourne Boomers in the Women's National Basketball League (WNBL) in the 2016–17 season, where she remained through 2019–20 season. Prior to the 2019–20 finals, Conti sought a release from her contract over conflicts between her basketball and football commitments. The release allowed her to play from the opening round of the AFLW season, but saw her give up the final year of her Boomers contract.

Southside Flyers
Conti joined the Southside Flyers for the 2020 season, with the condensed fixture in place as a result of the COVID-19 pandemic allowing Conti to complete the full commitments of both the WNBL and AFL Women's seasons. Conti was a member of the Flyers team that won the WNBL championship that season, the Flyers' first since changing their name from the Dandenong Rangers, but did not return for the 2021–22 season after choosing to focus solely on her AFL Women's career.

NBL1 South
In 2022, Conti began playing with the Casey Cavaliers in the semi-professional NBL1 South conference, but was unable to finish the club's inaugural season in the competition after again choosing to prioritise football, with AFL Women's season seven beginning in August.

AFL Women's career

Western Bulldogs (2018–2019)
She made her debut in the twenty-six point win against  in round 1, 2018 at VU Whitten Oval. She was also selected in afl.com.aus Team of the Week in rounds 3 and 5. Conti was a member of the Western Bulldogs team that won the AFL Women's premiership in 2018, defeating  by six points at Ikon Park, and won the medal for best-on-ground in the grand final. She was also named in the initial 2018 AFL Women's All-Australian 40-woman squad. The Western Bulldogs signed Conti for the 2019 season during the trade and signing period in May 2018.

Conti improved on her debut season in 2019, achieving selection in womens.afls Team of the Week in round 7 after recording a then-career-high 25 disposals in the Bulldogs' loss to Carlton at VU Whitten Oval and finishing equal-fourth in the 2019 AFL Women's best and fairest count with seven votes. She was also named in the 2019 AFL Women's All-Australian team and won the Western Bulldogs best and fairest award.

Richmond (2020–present)
Conti went on to win the club's VFLW best and fairest award and finish second in voting for the Lambert–Pearce Medal, despite only playing seven games. By December, Conti was expected to miss up to the first five games of Richmond's inaugural season in the AFLW due to the 2020 WNBL Finals clashing with the opening rounds of the 2020 AFL Women's season; however, in January 2020, Conti announced that she had requested to be released from her Melbourne Boomers contract to focus on playing in Richmond's inaugural AFLW season.

Leading into the 2020 season, womens.afl journalist Sarah Black named Conti at no. 13 on her list of the top 30 players in the AFLW. She made her Richmond debut in the club's inaugural game against Carlton at Ikon Park, and was named among Richmond's best players. She went on to be selected in the initial 40-woman squad for the 2020 AFL Women's All-Australian team. Conti was also selected in the AFL Players Association's inaugural AFL Women's 22under22 team, having earlier been selected in the retrospective 2017–2019 team, and won the inaugural Richmond best and fairest award.

Leading into the 2021 season, Sarah Black again named Conti at no. 13 on her annual list of the top 30 players in the AFLW. Conti was among the club's best players in round 1 and was named Richmond's best player in the following four matches. She best afield in the round 4 loss to Carlton and Richmond's inaugural AFLW win against Geelong in round 5, and was selected in womens.afls Team of the Week for those same rounds. Conti pulled up sore from the round 5 match, and was a late withdrawal the following week with hamstring soreness; she was among the best afield with 25 disposals and seven tackles upon her return in Richmond's round 7 win against . At the conclusion of the season, Conti was selected in the 2021 AFL Women's All-Australian team. Conti also achieved selection in Champion Data's 2021 AFLW All-Star stats team after leading the league for average ground-ball gets in the 2021 season, totalling 10.6 a game, a league record to that point.

Conti focused solely on the upcoming AFL Women's season leading into 2022, completing a full pre-season for the first time after her WNBL commitments prevented her from doing so in previous years. She was named at no. 10 in Sarah Black's 2022 list of the top 30 players in the AFLW, which was Conti's first appearance in the top ten. Conti was best afield with a career-high 29 disposals and nine clearances in Richmond's round 1 win against , with  AFL midfielder and Brownlow Medallist Patrick Dangerfield tweeting during the match that she could win that season's AFL Women's best and fairest award playing at that level if Richmond won enough games; she also won the maximum ten coaches' votes and was named in womens.afls Team of the Week. She was named Richmond's best player in its loss to Fremantle in round 3 and was the only Richmond player to poll coaches' votes, with six. Despite being heavily tagged, Conti was named among Richmond's best players in its loss to Gold Coast in round 4 with a team-high 21 disposals and game-high ten tackles, and was Richmond's best player in its loss to the Western Bulldogs in round 5, polling five coaches' votes. Conti also received the maximum ten coaches' votes and was selected in womens.afls Team of the Week for round 7. Conti was Richmond's best player in its last three matches of the season, polling the maximum ten coaches' votes in round 9. Conti was named in Champion Data's 2022 AFLW All-Star stats team after leading the competition for contested possessions with 15.2 a game.

Statistics
Updated to the end of S7 (2022).

|-
| bgcolor=F0E68C | 2018# ||  || 8
| 8 || 3 || 3 || 71 || 39 || 110 || 23 || 14 || 0.4 || 0.4 || 8.9 || 4.9 || 13.8 || 2.9 || 1.8 || 0
|-
| 2019 ||  || 8
| 7 || 1 || 3 || 73 || 53 || 126 || 20 || 31 || 0.1 || 0.4 || 10.4 || 7.6 || 18.0 || 2.9 || 4.4 || 7
|-
| 2020 ||  || 4
| 6 || 0 || 2 || 61 || 58 || 119 || 16 || 29 || 0.0 || 0.3 || 10.2 || 9.7 || 19.8 || 2.7 || 4.8 || 7
|-
| 2021 ||  || 4
| 8 || 0 || 2 || 86 || 92 || 178 || 14 || 25 || 0.0 || 0.3 || 10.8 || bgcolor=CAE1FF | 11.5† || 22.3 || 1.8 || 3.1 || 12
|-
| 2022 ||  || 4
| 10 || 2 || 3 || 117 || 122 || 239 || 16 || 59 || 0.2 || 0.3 || 11.7 || 12.2 || 23.9 || 1.6 || 5.9 || 11
|-
| S7 (2022) ||  || 4
| 12 || 9 || 8 || 123 || 130 || 253 || 22 || 73 || 0.8 || 0.7 || 10.3 || 10.8 || 21.1 || 1.8 || 6.1 || 19
|- class=sortbottom
! colspan=3 | Career
! 51 !! 15 !! 21 !! 531 !! 494 !! 1025 !! 111 !! 231 !! 0.3 !! 0.4 !! 10.4 !! 9.7 !! 20.1 !! 2.2 !! 4.5 !! 56
|}

Honours and achievements
Team
 AFL Women's premiership player: 2018
 AFL Women's minor premiership: 2018

Individual
 AFL Women's Grand Final best-on-ground: 2018
 AFLPA AFLW most valuable player: S7
 4× AFL Women's All-Australian team: 2019, 2021, 2022, S7
 Western Bulldogs best and fairest: 2019
 4× Richmond best and fairest: 2020, 2021, 2022, S7
 3× AFL Women's 22under22 team: 2020, 2021, 2022 (c)
 AFL Women's 2017–2019 22under22 team
 AFL Women's Rising Star nominee: 2018

References

External links

 
 
 

1999 births
Living people
Australian rules footballers from Melbourne
Western Bulldogs (AFLW) players
Australian women's basketball players
Melbourne Boomers players
Sportswomen from Victoria (Australia)
Guards (basketball)
Melbourne University Football Club (VFLW) players
Richmond Football Club (AFLW) players
People from Fitzroy, Victoria
Australian people of Italian descent